Ian Berry (born 1934) is a British photojournalist with Magnum Photos. He made his reputation in South Africa, where he worked for the Daily Mail and later for Drum magazine. He was the only photographer to document the massacre at Sharpeville in 1960, and his photographs were used in the trial to prove the victims' innocence. Ian Berry was also invited by Henri Cartier-Bresson to join Magnum Photos in 1962 when he was based in Paris; five years later he became a full member.

Early life
Berry was born in Preston, Lancashire, England.

Photography career
He moved to South Africa in 1952, where he soon taught himself photography. He worked under the tutelage of Roger Madden, a South African photographer who had been an assistant to Ansel Adams. After some time as an amateur photographer, Berry began photographing communities and weddings. During this period he met Jürgen Schadeberg, also a European immigrant and photographer. Schadeberg was offered a position with the new African Sunday newspaper eGoli but declined, suggesting Berry apply for the position instead. After working there only 10 months, the newspaper closed, and Berry began working for the Benoni City Times, but he soon became more interested in freelance work.

Berry returned to Great Britain and traveled for some time but returned to South Africa in the early 1960s and worked for the Daily Mail. Later Tom Hopkinson, previously editor of the British Picture Post, hired Berry to work for Drum magazine. He was in Sharpeville on 21 March 1960, when a peaceful protest turned violent, leading to the deaths of 69 people and the wounding of 178 others by police. There were no other photographs documenting the events, and Berry's were entered into evidence in the court proceedings proving that the victims had done nothing wrong. Berry was invited by Henri Cartier-Bresson to join Magnum Photos in 1962 when he was based in Paris; five years later he became a full member. In 1964 he moved to London and began working for Observer Magazine. He has since traveled the globe, documenting social and political strife in China, Republic of Congo, Czechoslovakia, Ethiopia, Israel, Ireland, Vietnam, and the former Soviet Union.He has contributed to publications including Esquire, Fortune, Geo, Life, National Geographic, Paris-Match, and Stern.

Berry's photographs have been exhibited world-wide and some are now included in the Magnum Photos: Photographic Collection at the Harry Ransom Center, University of Texas at Austin. Bob Dylan uses one of his photos for the cover of his album Rough and Rowdy Ways.

Awards

1959: Nikon World Photo Contest Awards - 1st and 3rd
1959: British Press Pictures, Feature Photographer of Year Award
1960: British Press Pictures, Feature Photographer of Year Award
1969: Art Directors Club of New York Award
1974: Awarded British Arts Council's first major photographic bursary (led to his book, The English)
1977: Nikon Photographer of Year Award (first ever)
1981: 1981 Pix of Year, magazine news, Award from Missouri School of Journalism and National Press Photographers Association
1990: Made Honorary Fellow, University of Lancashire
1995: Made Honorary Fellow of the Royal Photographic Society
2005: National photography magazine award for lifetime achievement in photography

Books
The English, 1978.
World Photography: 25 Great Photographers by Bryn Campbell, 1981.
Black and Whites: L'Afrique du Sud with a foreword by François Mitterrand, 1988.
Les Grands Travaux with Martine Franck and Rene Burri, France: RMN, 1989.
In Our Time: The World As Seen by MAGNUM Photographers. W. W. Norton, 1990. .
Living Apart, text by Archbishop Desmond Tutu. Phaidon Press, 1996. .
Ian Berry, I Grandi Fotografi, 2006.
Mar: A Pesca en Galicia, 2008.
Sold into Slavery, CDP editions, 2008. .

References

External links

 Magnum Photos, biography on Berry
 South Africa history online

British photojournalists
Artists from Preston, Lancashire
Magnum photographers
Daily Mail photojournalists
1934 births
Living people
Photography in South Africa
Photographers from Lancashire
British expatriates in South Africa